The British Academy Video Games Award for Artistic Achievement is an award presented annually by the British Academy of Film and Television Arts (BAFTA). It is given "for demonstrating exceptional visual art across all genres". 

The award was first presented at the 2nd British Academy Games Awards in 2005 to Half-Life 2 under the name Art Direction. The following year it was awarded as Artistic Achievement and has been presented under that name ever since. As developers, Ubisoft Montreal hold the record for most nominations, with seven, as well as most nominations without a win. Media Molecule and Thatgamecompany are the only developers to have won the category twice. The most nominated publishers are Sony Interactive Entertainment, who have thirty three and six wins. Electronic Arts and Xbox Game Studios are tied for most nominations without a win, with seven. 

The current holder of the award is The Artful Escape by Beethoven & Dinosaur and Annapurna Interactive, which won at the 18th British Academy Games Awards in 2022.

Winners and nominees
In the following table, the years are listed as per BAFTA convention, and generally correspond to the year of game release in the United Kingdom.

 Note: The games that don't have recipients on the table had Development Team credited on the awards page.

Multiple nominations and wins

Developers

Publishers

References

External links
Official website

Artistic Achivement